The 2012 Quito Challenger was a professional tennis tournament played on clay courts. It was the 18th edition of the tournament which was part of the 2012 ATP Challenger Tour. It took place in Quito, Ecuador between 1 and 7 October 2012.

Singles main draw entrants

Seeds

 1 Rankings are as of September 24, 2012.

Other entrants
The following players received wildcards into the singles main draw:
  Joseph Correa
  Lucas Dages
  José Chamba Gómez
  Nicolás Massú

The following players received entry from the qualifying draw:
  Juan Carvajal
  Frederico Gil
  Miguel Ángel Reyes-Varela
  Goran Tošić

Champions

Singles

 João Souza def.  Guillaume Rufin, 6–2, 7–6(7–4)

Doubles

 Juan Sebastián Cabal /  Carlos Salamanca def.  Marcelo Demoliner /  João Souza, 7–6(9–7), 7–6(7–4)

External links
Official Website

 
Quito Challenger
Quito Challenger
Quito Challenger